Olivier Thomas (born 6 October 1974) is a French former professional footballer who played as a defender.

Career
Thomas was born in Saint-Denis, Paris. He counts Le Mans UC 72, AS Nancy, Troyes AC, FC Nantes Atlantique and AC Ajaccio as his former clubs.

Honours
Troyes
UEFA Intertoto Cup: 2001

References

External links

1974 births
Living people
French footballers
Association football defenders
AS Nancy Lorraine players
ES Troyes AC players
Le Mans FC players
FC Sochaux-Montbéliard players
AC Ajaccio players
Ligue 1 players
Ligue 2 players
Championnat National players